Anneliese is a female given name of either German, Dutch or Nordic origin. It is a compound form of "Anna" and "Liese", a short form of "Elisabeth".

It may refer to:
Anneliese Bauer, East German slalom canoer who competed in the late 1950s and early 1960s
Anneliese Bläsing (1923–1996), German politician
Anneliese Dodds (born 1978), British politician
Anneliese Dørum (1939–2000), Norwegian politician for the Labour Party
Anneliese Dressel, broadcaster on C103 FM. C103 FM from Cork, Ireland
Anneliese Groscurth (1910–1996), wife of Georg Groscurth, member an antifascist German resistance group in Berlin during the Nazi era
Anneliese Heard (born 1981), Welsh triathlete from Bassaleg near Newport, Wales
Anneliese Maier (1905–1971), German historian of science
Anneliese Michel (1952–1976), German Catholic woman, supposedly disturbed with demons, who underwent an exorcism
Anneliese Rothenberger (1924–2010), German operatic soprano
Anneliese Schuh-Proxauf (born 1922), Austrian former alpine skier who competed in the 1948 Winter Olympics
Anneliese Seubert (born 1973), Australian model
Anneliese van der Pol (born 1984), Dutch-American actress and singer
Anneliese von Oettingen (1917–2002), ballerina and influential ballet teacher and choreographer

Annelise 
Annelise or Annalise is a Danish female given name. The German spelling (pronounced identically) is Anneliese or Annaliese. The name may refer to:

Annalise Basso (born 1998), American actress
Annalise Braakensiek (born 1972), Australian model
Annelise Coberger (born 1971), New Zealand skier
Annelise Hesme (born 1976), French actress
Annelise Høegh (1948–2015), Norwegian politician
Annelise Hovmand (born 1924), Danish filmmaker
Annelise Josefsen (born 1949), Norwegian-Sami artist
Annalise Murphy (born 1990), Irish sailor
Annelise Reenberg (1919–1994), Danish filmmaker
Annelise Riles (born 1966), American legal scholar

See also
Anne Frank's full first name was Annelies
Annelies
Annelles

References

German feminine given names
Dutch feminine given names
Scandinavian feminine given names
Swedish feminine given names
Norwegian feminine given names
Icelandic feminine given names
Finnish feminine given names
Danish feminine given names